The year 699 BC was a year of the pre-Julian Roman calendar. In the Roman Empire, it was known as year 55 Ab urbe condita . The denomination 699 BC for this year has been used since the early medieval period, when the Anno Domini calendar era became the prevalent method in Europe for naming years.

Events

By place

Middle East 
 Khallashu succeeds Shuttir-Nakhkhunte as king of the Elamite Empire.
 Manasseh succeeds Hezekiah as king of Judah. The first king who did not have an experience with the Kingdom of Israel, Manasseh ruled with his mother, Hephzibah, as regent.

Births

Deaths

References